Stein's Peak Station, was one of the original stage stations of the Butterfield Overland Mail. Its ruins are still to be seen in Doubtful Canyon, at an elevation of 4652 feet, northeast of Stein's Peak in Hidalgo County, New Mexico. Later stations were located midway between these stations to provide water and changes of horse teams in the hot, arid climate. These were San Simon Station to the west and Mexican Springs Station to the east of Lordsburg, New Mexico.

References

New Mexico Territory
Butterfield Overland Mail in New Mexico Territory
Geography of Hidalgo County, New Mexico
Stagecoach stations in New Mexico